Hamburger Straße is a rapid transit station located in the Hamburg district of Barmbek-Süd, Germany. The elevated station was opened in 1912 and is served by Hamburg U-Bahn line U3.

Service

Trains  
Hamburger Straße is served by Hamburg U-Bahn line U3; departures are every 5 minutes.

See also 

 List of Hamburg U-Bahn stations

References

External links 

 Line and route network plans at hvv.de 

Hamburg U-Bahn stations in Hamburg
U3 (Hamburg U-Bahn) stations
Buildings and structures in Hamburg-Nord
Hamburg HamburgerStr
Hamburg HamburgerStr